The 2007–08 football season was Plymouth Argyle Football Club's 38th season in the Football League Championship, the second division of English football, and their 102nd as a professional club.

Summary of the 2006–07 season 
After only eight months as manager, during which he was credited with saving Argyle from relegation, Tony Pulis returned to Stoke in mid-June. Two weeks later, former QPR manager Ian Holloway, was appointed manager. 

Holloway quickly added the team's only striker, Nick Chadwick, with veteran Barry Hayles from Millwall and 20-year-old Sylvan Ebanks-Blake from Man United who became the leading scorers of the season with 14 and 10 goals respectively. The addition of Dutch defender Marcel Seip, ultimately displaced Aljofree in central defence. In goal, Luke McCormick got first team action with Romain Larrieu out sick and kept his place. 

Several young players established themselves in the first team especially Gary Sawyer who became a regular on the left of defense, especially after Tony Capaldi appeared set to leave at the end of the season.  Luke Summerfield and Dan Gosling also impressed.

The first third of the season saw a fairly good start, where Holloway's signings, enthusiasm and more attacking style appeared to be lifting team performances from the previous season and to 6th place after 15 games. The possibility play-off and even promotion began to be talked about. However, the lack of depth showed mid-season as the accumulation of suspensions and injuries (including Paul Wotton out for the season with a knee injury) forced Holloway to draw ever deeper into reserves, and with a slide in results and position.

Holloway moved aggressively during the January transfer window, bringing in loanees Kevin Gallen (striker, QPR), Hungarians Péter Halmosi (midfield) and Krisztián Timár (defense), and 17-year-old Scott Sinclair (left wing, Chelsea) and permanent signing Rory Fallon (Halmosi and Timár became permanent signings at the end of the season). Settling the new players in took time and though performances improved, it was not sufficiently to boost Argyle far up the table. 

However, Argyle had an excellent FA Cup run making it into the Quarter Finals before losing 0–1 against Watford, the farthest any non-premiership team made it. It was, however, a game that they should have won and the lack of killer instinct showed in this game and others. The team seemed to go into a funk after the Watford loss with a string of mediocre results which saw them drifting in mid-table. However, the team rallied at the end of the season with five successive wins and its best finish in 50 years. 

In its third season in the Championship, Argyle had become an established team, with a solid and stable line up of players, highly regarded management, and optimism for the next season.

Midfielder Lilian Nalis was voted player of the year and defender Gary Sawyer young player of the year. 

While Argyle ended the season with no financial troubles, a big question remains over the ability of the team to attract the investment likely needed to lift the team to the Premiership with investments in players, stadium, and training facilities.

Team
The 2006–07 Plymouth Argyle first-team squad:

  

 

12 Green Army is not a real player, but was registered by the club as a tribute to the supporters. The idea behind assigning the number 12 was that the great support from fans gives Argyle a similar advantage to having an extra (twelfth) player.

Transfers

Out

In

Competitions

Championship

Table

Results

FA Cup

League Cup

Results Summary

Pre-season results
The pre-season saw wins over Tiverton (4–0), Grays Athletic (3–0), FC Gratkorn (5–1), and Yeovil (2–0) and losses to Real Madrid (0–1) and Bristol Rovers (0–1). A pre-season altercation between first-year Chris Zebroski and team captain, mid-fielder Paul Wotton in an Austrian bar resulted in 100 stitches to Wotton's head and the sacking of Zebroski. Wotton recovered for the first game of the season.

References

Plymouth Argyle F.C. seasons
Plymouth Argyle